SM U-44 was one of the 329 submarines serving in the Imperial German Navy in World War I. She was engaged in the naval warfare and took part in the First Battle of the Atlantic. Launched in 1915, she was sunk in August 1917.

Operations 
SM U-44, under the command of Paul Wagenführ, was completed at Danzig about June or July 1915. She later joined the Kiel School, where she remained until 20 August 1915 undergoing trials. She then proceeded to the North Sea and was attached to the 3rd Half Flotilla.
 
25 – 26 September 1915. On Bight patrol.
5–10 October, 16–21 October, and 26–29 October 1915. Bight patrols.
14–25 December 1915. North Sea cruise.
17–28 January 1916. North Sea cruise to NE coast of England.
18 March – 17 April 1916. Northabout to Channel approach, was possibly submarine which torpedoed HMS Begonia. Sank 5 S.S., 2 sailing vessels.
17 May – 3 June 1916. North Sea patrol (Battle of Jutland).
16–21 July 1916. North Sea patrol, Returned with defect.
26 July – 5 August 1916. North Sea. Returned owing to bad weather.
16–21 August 1916. North Sea patrol.
17–29 September 1916. Cruise to Fair Island Channel, sank 2 S.S., 1 armed yacht, 1 armed trawler.
1–25 January 1917. Northabout to SW of Ireland. Returned with fracture of propeller shaft. Sank 1 S.S., 3 prizes (trawlers).
19 February 1917. Left for the North, but returned next day with defect.
24 February – 24 March 1917. Northabout to Atlantic. Sank 3 sailing vessels, and 5 S.S.
23 April - ? 7 May 1917. Northabout ? to west of Ireland. Sank 1 sailing vessel ? 1 S.S.

On 12 August 1917, U-44 was rammed and sunk in the North Sea south of Norway by the Royal Navy destroyer  with the loss of all 44 of her crew.

Summary of raiding history

References

Notes

Citations

Bibliography

World War I submarines of Germany
Type U 43 submarines
1914 ships
Ships built in Danzig
Maritime incidents in 1917
U-boats sunk in 1917
U-boats sunk by British warships
Ships lost with all hands
World War I shipwrecks in the North Sea